Thomas Jens Uwe Doll (born 9 April 1966) is a German professional football manager and a former football player who is the current Manager of Persija Jakarta. He played as an attacking midfielder for F.C. Hansa Rostock, BFC Dynamo, Hamburger SV, Lazio, Eintracht Frankfurt and Bari.

Club career
Doll began playing football for the youth teams of local side BSG Lokomotiv Malchin. He was allowed to join the youth academy of football club F.C. Hansa Rostock in 1979. Doll joined the first team of F.C. Hansa Rostock in 1983. He made his debut for F.C. Hansa Rostock in the DDR-Oberliga away against BSG Stahl Riesa in the third matchday of the 1983-84 DDR-Oberliga on 27 August 1983.

F.C. Hansa Rostock was relegated to the second tier DDR-Liga after the 1985-86 DDR-Oberliga. Doll then joined BFC Dynamo in order to ensure a chance to play for the national team. BFC Dynamo was the dominant team in East German football at the time. Doll had the opportunity to choose between BFC Dynamo and SG Dynamo Dresden, but wanted to go to Berlin to be able to stay close to his family and because he already knew players in BFC Dynamo from the national youth teams, such as Andreas Thom.

Doll immediately became a regular player in the first team of BFC Dynamo. He scored his first goal for BFC Dynamo in the DDR-Oberliga in the derby against 1. FC Union Berlin at the Stadion der Weltjugend on 13 September 1986. BFC Dynamo won the match with a massive 8-1. Doll and Thom formed one of the most effective attacking constellations in East German football the late 1980s. Doll won the DDR-Oberliga in 1987 and 1988 and the FDGB-Pokal in 1988 and 1989 with BFC Dynamo. BFC Dynamo then met SG Dynamo Dresden in the first ever DFV-Supercup on 5 August 1989. BFC Dynamo won the match 4-1 and became the first and only winner of the DFV-Supercup in the history of East German football. Doll scored two goals in the match.

After reunification, Doll was one of the most sought-after players of coming out of the former East Germany. Together with fellow sweeper Frank Rohde in BFC Dynamo he joined Hamburger SV in 1990. After just one season there he had impressed sufficiently to move to Italian side Lazio for a then record fee of DM15 million. He played at Lazio for three years, before returning to the Bundesliga in 1994, joining Eintracht Frankfurt, but he was hampered by injuries in the three seasons he spent with the club and made only 28 appearances. After a year in Italy with Bari, he returned to Hamburger SV in 1998. He played another three seasons, but injuries continued to take their toll.

International career
At international level, Doll represented both East Germany (29 caps, seven goals) and the unified Germany (18 caps, 1 goal). His last international appearance came in 1993. He was part of Germany's squad for Euro 1992 where the side finished as runners-up to Denmark.

Coaching career

Hamburger SV
Following his retirement, he became part of Hamburg's coaching staff, managing the reserves from 2002 until being appointed first-team manager in 2004.

Early in his tenure as coach with Hamburg, he enjoyed some success, saving the team from relegation in his first season, winning the Intertoto Cup, and then guiding the club to a much-improved third-place result in the 2005–06 season to earn a Champions League berth. The 2006–07 season, however, was less successful for the coach. The team delivered a disappointing performance in the Champions League that saw only one win in six first-round games, and then plunged to the bottom of the Bundesliga table by mid-season. Doll was sacked on 1 February 2007.

Borussia Dortmund
On 19 May 2008, Doll resigned as the coach of Borussia Dortmund after the team finished a disappointing 13th in the Bundesliga.

Gençlerbirliği
He agreed to manage Gençlerbirliği S.K. and signed a two-year contract.

Al-Hilal
On 20 July 2011, he was appointed as head coach of Saudi Arabian champion team, Al-Hilal but was sacked on 22 January 2012.

Ferencváros

He became head coach of Hungarian club Ferencváros on 18 December 2013. On 20 May 2015, Ferencváros beat Videoton 4–0 at the Groupama Arena in the 2014–15 Magyar Kupa Final.

Doll's Ferencváros secured the club's 29th Nemzeti Bajnokság I title on 2 April 2016 after a defeat at the Nagyerdei Stadion against Debreceni VSC. By winning the 2015–16 Nemzeti Bajnokság I season, Doll managed to win all the possible titles in football in Hungary.
In recognition of his record performance with Ferencváros, Doll received the "Coach of the year in NB I" award from the Hungarian Football Federation in 2016.

Ferencváros were eliminated in the second round of the 2016–17 UEFA Champions League by the second-placed team of the 2015-16 Albanian Superliga, FK Partizani Tirana, on penalties. They placed fourth in the 2016–17 Nemzeti Bajnokság I season - the title was won by their rivals Budapest Honvéd FC. However, Ferencváros fans were consoled by team's win in the 2017 Magyar Kupa Final against Vasas SC.

The 2017–18 Nemzeti Bajnokság I season started with moderate success, but aspirations in international cups were once again thwarted when Ferencváros lost to FC Midtjylland in the second round of the 2017–18 UEFA Europa League.

Hannover 96
On 27 January 2019, Bundesliga club Hannover 96 announced Doll as the new manager of the club, replacing the sacked André Breitenreiter. He left the club as Mirko Slomka was confirmed as the club's new manager on 28 May 2019.

APOEL FC
On 15 August 2019, Doll became manager of APOEL.

Having managed to guide APOEL to the round of 32 of the 2019–20 UEFA Europa League, on 9 December 2019, Doll got relieved of his duties as the club's manager by mutual consent.

Persija Jakarta
On 23 April 2022, Liga 1 club Persija Jakarta announced Doll as the new manager of the club.

Personal life
Doll has two daughters, one with his Italian-born wife Roberta, the other with a former wife now married to another ex-footballer, Olaf Bodden. He lives in Budapest.

Controversy
Doll and Indonesian national team head coach, Shin Tae-yong, relationship becomes heated. In late January 2023, Doll has turned down nine of his players' calls to attend the training camp for the national team. In addition, Doll referred to Tae-yong as a clown during a press conference for appearing in television ads.

Career statistics

Club

Managerial statistics

Honours

Playing
Berliner FC Dynamo
DDR-Oberliga: 1986–87, 1987–88
FDGB-Pokal: 1987–88, 1988–89
DFV-Supercup: 1989

Managerial
Hamburger SV
 UEFA Intertoto Cup: 2005

Borussia Dortmund
 DFB-Pokal runner-up: 2008–09

Ferencváros
 Nemzeti Bajnokság I: 2015–16
 Magyar Kupa: 2014–15, 2015–16, 2016–17
 Ligakupa: 2014–15
 Szuperkupa: 2015

References

External links

1966 births
Living people
People from Malchin
German expatriate footballers
German footballers
East German footballers
Germany international footballers
German football managers
Berliner FC Dynamo players
FC Hansa Rostock players
Hamburger SV players
Eintracht Frankfurt players
S.S. Lazio players
S.S.C. Bari players
Serie A players
Serie B players
UEFA Euro 1992 players
Association football midfielders
Bundesliga players
East Germany international footballers
Borussia Dortmund managers
Gençlerbirliği S.K. managers
Hamburger SV managers
Ferencvárosi TC managers
Hannover 96 managers
Expatriate footballers in Italy
German expatriate sportspeople in Italy
Dual internationalists (football)
Bundesliga managers
German expatriate football managers
Expatriate football managers in Turkey
Expatriate football managers in Saudi Arabia
Expatriate football managers in Hungary
Expatriate football managers in Cyprus
Al Hilal SFC managers
Süper Lig managers
APOEL FC managers
German expatriate sportspeople in Turkey
German expatriate sportspeople in Hungary
DDR-Oberliga players
Footballers from Mecklenburg-Western Pomerania
German expatriate sportspeople in Saudi Arabia
Nemzeti Bajnokság I managers
German expatriate sportspeople in Indonesia
Persija Jakarta managers
Expatriate football managers in Indonesia